The many-banded tree snake (Boiga multifasciata) is a species of rear-fanged colubrid. Not much is known about it and it is rated as "data deficient" by the IUCN.

Description

Dorsally, it is grayish with oblique black crossbars, and  has a series of whitish spots along the vertebral line. On the head, it has a pair of black streaks from the prefrontals to the occiput, another black streak from the eye to the commissure of the jaws, and another along the nape. The upper labials are black-edged. Ventrally, it is spotted or checkered with dark brown or black. Adults are about 875 mm (34.5 in) in total length.

Geographic range

It is found in India (Himachal Pradesh up to Sikkim), Nepal and Bhutan.

References

 Whitaker, Romulus and Ashok Captain 2004 Snakes of India. Draco Books, 500 pp.
 Blyth,E. 1861 Proceedings of the Society. Report of the Curator. J. Asiatic Soc. Bengal xxix [1860]: 98, 107-111

multifasciata
Reptiles of South Asia
Reptiles described in 1861
Taxa named by Edward Blyth